Juan de Dios Videla Moyano ( Mendoza, Argentina , March 7, 1815 - Ibid., September 3, 1880) was an Argentine soldier who held the position as Governor of Mendoza from December 16, 1861 to January 2 , 1862 . He was also Governor of San Juan for a few months in 1867.

Governors of Mendoza Province
1815 births
1880 deaths
People from Mendoza, Argentina
Governors of San Juan Province, Argentina
Federales (Argentina)